is a 2010 Japanese film directed by Hitoshi Yazaki, based on a novel by Kaori Ekuni.

Cast
 Miki Nakatani
 Nao Ōmori
 Mei Kurokawa
 Chizuru Ikewaki
 Yuko Oshima
 Sakura Ando
 Mei Kurokawa

References

External links
 Official website 
 

Films directed by Hitoshi Yazaki
2010s Japanese films